Asagena americana, the twospotted cobweb spider, is a species of cobweb spider in the family Theridiidae. It is found in the United States, Canada, and China.

References

Theridiidae
Articles created by Qbugbot
Spiders described in 1882
Spiders of North America
Spiders of China